Gaudenzio Godioz (born 26 February 1968) is an Italian cross-country skier who competed from 1992 to 2000. His best World Cup finish was sixth twice, both in the 30 km events with one each in 1992 and in 1995.

Godioz's best finish at the FIS Nordic World Ski Championships was ninth in the 50 km event at Thunder Bay in 1995. Participating in the 50 km event of the 1999 Italian men's championships of cross-country skiing, he finished third. Godioz, Nicola Invernizzi and Emanuel Conta competed in the "international military" class at the Patrouille des Glaciers in 2000, where they placed ninth in the total ranking.

Cross-country skiing results
All results are sourced from the International Ski Federation (FIS).

World Championships

World Cup

Season standings

Team podiums

 3 podiums

References

External links

1968 births
Italian male cross-country skiers
Italian military patrol (sport) runners
Living people